The Forum for African Women Educationalists (FAWE) is a pan-African non-governmental organization founded in 1992 by five women ministers of education to promote girls’ and women’s education in sub-Saharan Africa by making sure they have access to schools and are able to complete their studies and fulfill their potential, in line with UNESCO's Education For All movement. The organisation's members include ministers of education, university vice-chancellors, education policy-makers, researchers, gender specialists and human rights activists.

It has its secretariat in Nairobi. Currently it has 34 national chapters in 33 countries, including Benin, Gabon, Gambia, Ghana, Guinea, Liberia, Nigeria, Rwanda, Senegal, Sierra Leone, Tanzania, Uganda and Togo among others.

It is an International Partner Office for the Ford Foundation International Fellowships Program, and a partner organization of the Association of African Women for Research and Development.

Key individual members include:
Penina Mlama - Executive Director
Esi Sutherland-Addy - Executive Board member
Charles Ndungu - Former Research Assistant
Graça Machel - Former Board member
Aïcha Bah Diallo - Founding President

See also
Femmes Africa Solidarité
Christiana Thorpe - founder of Sierra Leone branch
N‘Dri Thérèse Assié-Lumumba
Fay Chung - cofounder 
Nasima Badsha -  a founder member of the South African branch of the Forum for African Women Educationalists. 
Gladys Kalema-Zikusoka
Judith Ngalande Lungu

External links 
 FAWE
 Forum for African Women Educationalists of Zambia 
 Forum for African Women Educationalists, Rwanda Chapter
 Forum for African Women Educationalists, Uganda
 Forum for African Women Educationalists, Eswatini Chapter

Women and education in Africa
Organizations established in 1992
1992 establishments in Africa